Communist Workers League, was a small communist group in Norway. It was formed in 1972 by a group of Communist Party of Norway militants, who had either been expelled or left voluntarily. First KA oriented itself towards China, and later towards Albania.

KA published Den Røde Arbeideren (The Red Worker) annually in connection with May Day until 2005.

During the 1970s KA published Røde Fane (Red Flag).

In the spring of 2006 the group announced that it had dissolved itself.

External links
Den Røde Arbeideren

Communist parties in Norway
Defunct political parties in Norway
Maoist organizations in Europe
Political parties established in 1972
1972 establishments in Norway
2006 disestablishments in Norway
Political parties disestablished in 2006